Lester Wilbur Wilson (July 17, 1885 – April 4, 1969) was a professional baseball player. He appeared in five games in Major League Baseball for the Boston Red Sox during the 1911 season. He was born in St. Louis, Missouri.
 
Wilson, who was nicknamed "Tug", went hitless in seven at bats (.000) and received two walks, without scoring or driving in any runs. In three appearances as an outfielder, two in left field and one in right (1), he collected a 1.000 fielding percentage in four chances.

Wilson died at the age of 83 in Edmonds, Washington.

External links

Retrosheet

Major League Baseball outfielders
Boston Red Sox players
Vancouver Beavers players
Medicine Hat Hatters players
Saskatoon Berrypickers players
Calgary Bronchos players
New Bedford Whalers (baseball) players
Dubuque Dubs players
Seattle Giants players
Saskatoon Quakers (baseball) players
Tacoma Tigers players
Butte Miners players
Baseball players from Michigan
People from Edmonds, Washington
1885 births
1969 deaths
People from St. Louis, Michigan